The Mid-Eastern Athletic Conference Men's Basketball Player of the Year is an annual basketball award given to the Mid-Eastern Athletic Conference's (MEAC) most outstanding player. The award was first given following the 1971–72 season.  There has never been a tie for co-player of the year in the award's history, nor has there been a national player of the year. Two players have been named the MEAC Player of the Year three times: Marvin Webster of Morgan State (1973–75) and Joe Binion of North Carolina A&T (1982–84). The school with the most all-time honorees is North Carolina A&T, now a member of the Big South Conference, which has had nine winners, but its last award before its 2021 departure was in 1988. Among current members, Coppin State has the most recipients with eight. The only current member of the MEAC without a winner is Maryland Eastern Shore.

Key

Winners

Winners by school
In this table, "year joined" reflects the calendar year in which each school joined the conference, and years of departure for former members indicated in footnotes reflect the calendar year of departure. The "years" column reflects the calendar year of each award.

Footnotes

NCAA Division I men's basketball conference players of the year
Player
Awards established in 1972